Alcomenae or Alkomenai, also Alcomena or Alkomena (Ἀλκομενα), or Alalcomenae or Alalkomenai, was a town of the Deuriopes on the Erigon, in the Pelagonia Region in Ancient Macedonia.

Its site is tentatively located near modern Bučin (Buchin) In North Macedonia.

References

Populated places in ancient Macedonia
Former populated places in the Balkans